Chilotan architecture is a unique architectural style that is mainly restricted to the Chiloé Archipelago and neighboring areas of southern Chile. These buildings have been designated a UNESCO World Heritage Site.

History
Chiloé, in part because of its physical isolation from the rest of Chile and access to different materials, has a unique colonial architecture that differs substantially  from typical Chilean Spanish colonial architecture. 

Spanish colonial churches

The Spanish, who arrived in the 16th century and their Jesuit missionaries who followed, constructed hundreds of small wooden churches as part of the Indian Reductions mandated by the Crown for Spanish colonization of the Americas. The result was a mixing of Catholicism and indigenous Chilean beliefs. 

Houses and buildings
Nearly all the houses and buildings in colonial Chiloe were built with wood, and wooden shingles were extensively employed. The roof shingles of Fitzroya came to be used as money and called Real de Alerce. In the late 19th century many palafitos, or stilt houses, were built in cities such as Castro and Chonchi.

See also
German architecture in Southern Chile
Plan Serena

External links 
Unesco World Heritage Site - The Churches of Chiloe
Churches of Chiloe: descriptions and photograph gallery

Architecture in Chile
Architectural styles
Chiloé Archipelago
Colonial architecture in Chile